Boardman Township is a township in Clayton County, Iowa, USA.  As of the 2000 census, its population was 1,832.

History
Boardman Township is named for Elisha Boardman, who settled there in 1836.

Geography
According to the USGS, it contains three cemeteries: Eastside, Erhardt and Saint Josephs.

The streams of Dry Mill Creek and Roberts Creek run through this township.

Transportation
Boardman Township contains Elkader Municipal Airport.

Notes

References
 USGS Geographic Names Information System (GNIS)

External links
 US-Counties.com
 City-Data.com

Townships in Clayton County, Iowa
Townships in Iowa